Léon Marchand (born 17 May 2002) is a French swimmer. He is the European record holder in the long course 400 metre individual medley and the French record holder in the long course 200 metre individual medley, 200 metre butterfly and 200 metre breaststroke. He competed in the 400 metre individual medley at the 2020 Summer Olympics, placing sixth in the final. At the 2022 NCAA Division I Men's Swimming and Diving Championships, he won NCAA titles in the 200 yard breaststroke and 200 yard individual medley. He won the gold medal in the 400 metre individual medley and the 200 metre individual medley and the silver medal in the 200 metre butterfly at the 2022 World Aquatics Championships.

Career

2019 World Junior Championships

In August 2019, at the World Junior Swimming Championships in Budapest, Hungary, Marchand won the bronze medal in the 400 metre individual medley with a French record time of 4:16.37. He also placed seventh with a time of 2:01.53 in the 200 metre individual medley, seventh swimming a 1:58.73 in the final of the 200 metre butterfly, tenth in the 200 metre breaststroke with a 2:15.13, and 15th in the 100 metre breaststroke in a time of 1:03.03.

2020 Summer Olympics

Marchand qualified in his first event for the 2020 Summer Olympics at the 2021 French Elite Swimming Championships in Chartres, making the French Olympic Team in the 400 metre individual medley with a personal best and French record time of 4:09.65. At the 2020 Summer Olympics in Tokyo, Japan, Marchand placed sixth in the 400 metre individual medley with a 4:11.16, tenth in the 4×100 metre medley relay, 14th in the 200 metre butterfly with a 1:55.68, and 18th in the 200 metre individual medley with a 1:58.30.

2022 NCAA Championships

At the 2022 NCAA Division I Championships in March in Atlanta, United States, Marchand won his first individual NCAA title of his freshman year for the Arizona State Sun Devils in the 200 yard individual medley, winning the event and setting new NCAA, NCAA Championships, and US Open records with his time of 1:37.69, which was over four-tenths of a second faster than the old marks of 1:38.13 set by Caeleb Dressel in 2018 (NCAA and US Open records) and 1:38.14 set by Andrew Seliskar in 2019 (NCAA Championships record). It was the first time since 2000 that a man from the Arizona State University swim program won an individual title in swimming at a NCAA Division I Men's Swimming and Diving Championships. He won a second NCAA title in the 200 yard breaststroke, finishing 0.56 seconds ahead of second-place finisher Max McHugh with a time of 1:48.20. He placed second in the 400 yard individual medley, with a 3:34.08 to finish behind Hugo González, as well as in the 4×100 yard freestyle relay, where he split a 41.31 for the second leg of the relay to help finish in a final time of 2:46.40.

Seven days after the end of the 2022 NCAA Championships, Marchand set a new French record in the 200 metre individual medley at the 2022 Pro Swim Series at Northside Swim Center in San Antonio, United States, with a time of 1:56.95 and won the silver medal behind Shaine Casas who finished in 1:56.70. One day earlier, he won the 200 metre breaststroke with a time of 2:09.24.

2022 World Aquatics Championships

On 18 June, the first day of swimming at the 2022 World Aquatics Championships at Danube Arena in Budapest, Hungary, Marchand set a new French record in the 400 metre individual medley in the preliminary heats with a time of 4:09.09, qualifying for the evening final ranking first. He lowered his French record and set a new European record and Championships record in the final with a time of 4:04.28 to win the gold medal. Two days later, he qualified for the semifinals of the 200 metre butterfly with a time of 1:56.38 and tied rank of eleventh in the prelims. For the semifinals, he ranked 0.18 seconds ahead of the next-fastest swimmer, fifth-ranked Luca Urlando of the United States, and qualified for the final the following day with his new French record time of 1:54.32.

The following morning, he qualified for the semifinals of the 200 metre individual medley, swimming a 1:58.70 to tie for eighth-rank heading into the semifinals. For his first race of the evening, he set a new French record in the final of the 200 metre butterfly at 1:53.37 and won the silver medal, finishing behind Kristóf Milák of Hungary and ahead of Tomoru Honda of Japan. In his final race of the day, the semifinals of the 200 metre individual medley, he set a new French record with a time of 1:55.75 and qualified for the final ranking first. In the final of the 200 metre individual medley the following day, he won the gold medal with a French record time of 1:55.22. With his two gold medals, he became the third French swimmer to achieve two gold medals in individual events at a single FINA World Aquatics Championships, after Laure Manaudou and Florent Manaudou. He also became the first male swimmer representing France to win any medal in the 400 metre individual medley at a World Aquatics Championships and the first since 1998 to win a medal the 200 metre individual medley. On 23 June, he split a 1:47.59 for the second leg of the 4×200 metre freestyle relay in the final to help achieve a seventh-place finish in 7:08.78. In the preliminaries of the 4×100 metre medley relay on the eighth day, Marchand helped advance the relay to the final ranking second with a time of 52.09 seconds for the butterfly leg of the relay. He lowered his split to a 51.50 in the final, contributing to a time of 3:32.37 and fifth-place finish

The month after the Championships, Marchand set a new French record in the 200 metre breaststroke with a time of 2:08.76 at the 2022 Spanish Summer Championships in Sabadell, Spain.

2023
Leading up to NCAA and conference championships season in 2023, Marchand set new NCAA and US Open records in the 400 yard individual medley with a time of 3:31.84 in a dual meet against the California Golden Bears on 21 January.

2023 Pac-12 Conference Championships
On 1 March, the first day of the 2023 Pac-12 Conference Championships at King County Aquatic Center in Federal Way, United States, Marchand helped win the conference title in the 4×50 yard medley relay in a Pac-12 Conference and Championships record time of 1:21.69, splitting a 22.98 for the breaststroke leg of the relay. He repeated the trio of conference title, conference record, and Championships record later in the session in the 4×200 yard freestyle relay, where he contributed a lead-off time of 1:30.77 to the final mark of 6:06.30. The times for both relays also set new Arizona State Sun Devils swim program records for the men's events. Following up with a 1:37.81 in the 200 yard individual medley the next day, he won his second-consecutive conference title in the event and lowered his Championships record from the previous year's edition by 1.84 seconds. On day three, he lowered his US Open and NCAA records in the 400 yard individual medley, setting new conference, Championships, and program records with a time of 3:31.57 to win the conference title. He split a 49.73 for the breaststroke leg of the 4×100 yard medley relay later in the session, helping win the conference title with a program record time of 3:01.39.

The fourth of four days, Marchand broke the US Open and NCAA records of 1:47.91 in the 200 yard breaststroke set by Will Licon in 2017, winning the conference title with a personal best time of 1:47.67. For his final event, the 4×100 yard freestyle relay, he led-off with a 41.61 to contribute to a second-place time of 2:46.14. The points allocated for each of his swims contributed to an overall score of 897.5 points for the Arizona State Sun Devils, which earned the men's swim program its first team Pac-12 Conference Championships title.

International championships (50 m)

International championships (25 m)

Personal best times

Long course metres (50 m pool)

Short course yards (25 yd pool)

Records

Continental and national records

Long course metres (50 m pool)

US Open records

Short course yards (25 yd pool)

Awards and honours
 College Swimming and Diving Coaches Association of America (CSCAA), Swimmer of the Year (Men's): 2022
 Pac-12 Conference, Swimmer of the Year (Men's): 2021–2022
 Pac-12 Conference, Swimmer of the Meet, Pac-12 Conference Men's Swimming and Diving Championships: 2023
 Pac-12 Conference, Freshman of the Year (Men's): 2021–2022
 SwimSwam, Swammy Award, NCAA Swimmer of the Meet (Men's): 2022 NCAA Division I Championships
 SwimSwam, Swammy Award, NCAA Freshman of the Year (Men's): 2022

References

External links
 

2002 births
Living people
Sportspeople from Toulouse
Swimmers at the 2020 Summer Olympics
Olympic swimmers of France
French male freestyle swimmers
French male medley swimmers
French male breaststroke swimmers
French male butterfly swimmers
Arizona State Sun Devils men's swimmers
World Aquatics Championships medalists in swimming